Philo Atwood Orton, Jr., (March 27, 1837June 10, 1919) was an American lawyer, politician, judge, and banker.  He was a member of the Wisconsin State Assembly and held several local and county offices in Lafayette County, Wisconsin.

Biography

Born in Hamilton, Madison County, New York, he came to Wisconsin with his family in 1850, settling in Beloit.  He studied at Beloit College for two years.

Orton and his family moved to Darlington, Wisconsin, in Lafayette County, in 1855.  He studied law in the office of James R. Rose and was admitted to the State Bar of Wisconsin in 1859.

Orton married Sara Osborn, the daughter of Sylvester W. Osborn, in 1862.  He later took on her younger brother, Charles F. Osborn, as a student in his office.  After Osborn was admitted to the bar, they formed a partnership, Orton & Osborne, that endured in Darlington for fifty years.

Political career

He was the Democratic Party nominee for Attorney General of Wisconsin in 1861, but was defeated in the general election.  He won office in 1862 as district attorney for La Fayette County.  He was elected County Judge in 1870, running as an Independent, and served four years.  In 1876, he was the Democratic candidate for Congress in Wisconsin's 3rd congressional district, but was unsuccessful.  He supported James A. Garfield in the 1880 election, and, since then, he has identified as a Republican.  He returned to public office in 1899 as Lafayette County's representative to the Wisconsin State Assembly and served until 1903.

Education and business career

Orton served as president of the board of education in Darlington for twenty years.  He was a member of the board of regents of the University of Wisconsin from 1874 to 1877.

In 1874, he obtained a controlling stake in the La Fayette Bank, which he held until organizing the First National Bank of Darlington in 1882. He was president of the Bank of Darlington for the rest of his life.  He was also president of the Benton state bank at Benton, Wisconsin.

Family and personal life

Orton is a descendant of Thomas Orton, who arrived in Windsor, Connecticut Colony, in 1640.

He was one of the charter members of the Delta Kappa Epsilon chapter at Colgate University, and was an active Mason in the Darlington lodge.

He married Sara Osborn on January 27, 1862.  Her father, Sylvester W. Osborn, and brother, Charles F. Osborn, both served in the Wisconsin State Assembly.  Philo and Sara Osborn had one son and one daughter.

Orton died in Darlington on June 10, 1919.  He was blind for the last five years of his life.

Electoral history

| colspan="6" style="text-align:center;background-color: #e9e9e9;"| General Election, November 5, 1861

References

External links
 

1837 births
1919 deaths
People from Madison County, New York
Politicians from Beloit, Wisconsin
People from Darlington, Wisconsin
Beloit College alumni
Colgate University alumni
Wisconsin lawyers
Wisconsin state court judges
Wisconsin Democrats
Wisconsin Independents
Wisconsin Republicans
School board members in Wisconsin
Members of the Wisconsin State Assembly
19th-century American judges
19th-century American lawyers